Kangti is a Town and Mandal headquarters of Kangti Mandal in the Sangareddy district in Indian state of Telangana.

Geography
Kangti is located at Latitude:18°13'23.13"N Longitude: 77°36'56.98"E. It has an average elevation of 493 metres (1620 ft).

Demographics
According to the 2001 Indian census, the demographic details of Kangti mandal are as follows:
 Total population: 	44,769	in 7,594 households.
 Male population:  22,899 and female population: 21,870		
 Children under 6-years of age: 8,168	(boys - 4,084; girls - 4,084)	
 Total literates: 	13,683

The Kangti village had a population of 3,614 in 2001.

References

Mandals in Medak district